Theodore Carstens (June 20, 1879 – July 25, 1955) was an American fencer. He competed in the individual foil and sabre events at the 1904 Summer Olympics.

References

External links
 

1879 births
1955 deaths
Olympic fencers of the United States
Fencers at the 1904 Summer Olympics
People from Cedarburg, Wisconsin
Sportspeople from the Milwaukee metropolitan area
American male foil fencers
American male sabre fencers